Mount Grono is a  peak on Secretary Island, part of New Zealand's Fiordland National Park. It was named for early 19th century sealer John Grono.

Mount Grono is the highest peak in New Zealand's main island chain to be in neither the North nor the South Island.

Mountains of Fiordland